Unione Sportiva Forcoli Calcio 1921 Associazione Sportiva Dilettantistica is an Italian association football club located in Forcoli, a frazione of Palaia, Tuscany. It currently plays in Serie D.

History
The club was founded in 1921.

The team in the season 1999–2000 was promoted from Promozione Tuscany to Eccellenza and in the season 2003–04 from Eccellenza Tuscany to Serie D.

Colors and badge
Its colors are white and dark red.

References

External links
 Official homepage

Association football clubs established in 1921
Football clubs in Tuscany
1921 establishments in Italy